Herman I, Count of Henneberg (1224 – 18 December 1290) was the son of Count Poppo VII of Henneberg and his wife, Jutta of Thuringia (born: 1184; died: 6 August 1235 in Schleusingen), the eldest daughter of Landgrave Herman I of Thuringia.  This was Poppo's second marriage and also Jutta's second marriage.  Margrave Henry III of Meissen was Herman's half-brother from his mother's side.  Herman supported the election of his uncle Henry Raspe as anti-king of the Germans.

Herman founded the "new lordship" around Coburg and Eisenburg, which was inherited by the House of Wettin via his grand-niece Catherine of Henneberg.

Marriage and issue 
In 1249, Herman married with Margaret (died: 26 March 1276), the sister of Count William II of Holland and King of the Germans.  They had three children:
 Herman (d. 1250)
 Jutta (c. 1252 – c. 1312), married Margrave Otto V of Brandenburg-Salzwedel
 Poppo (c. 1254 – 1291), married Sophie of Wittelsbach (c. 1264 – 1282), daughter of Elizabeth of Hungary, but they had no issue

References 
 Bernhard Grossmann, Thomas Witter and Günther Wölfing: Auf den Spuren der Henneberger, Verlag Frankenschwelle, 1996,

External links 
 The poetry of the Tannhäusers – Annotated Kiel edition online 
 Entry at genealogie-mittelalter.de 

Counts of Henneberg
1224 births
1290 deaths
13th-century German nobility